The 6th Legislative Assembly of Quebec was the provincial legislature in Quebec, Canada that existed from October 14, 1886, to June 17, 1890. During most of the term, the Quebec Liberal Party, also known as the Parti national as that period, was the governing party. However, the Quebec Conservative Party despite losing the election tried to form a minority government with John Jones Ross and Louis-Olivier Taillon as Premiers but only managed to last a few months before the Liberals led by Honoré Mercier, the founder of the Parti National, formed a narrow majority government with 33 of the 65 seats of the Legislative Assembly of Quebec.

Seats per political party

 After the 1886 elections

Member list

This was the list of members of the Legislative Assembly of Quebec that were elected in the 1886 election:

Other elected MLAs

Other MLAs were elected during by-elections or in another district between the two general elections

 Georges Duhamel, Parti national, Iberville, December 11, 1886 
 Louis-Olivier Taillon, Quebec Conservative Party, Montcalm, December 11, 1886 
 Odilon Goyette, Parti national, St. Hyacinthe, July 30, 1887, 
 Alfred Rochon, Quebec Liberal Party, Ottawa (Outaouais), September 14, 1887 
 Louis-Phillippe Pelletier, Nationalist Conservative, Dorchester, December 20, 1888 
 Charles Champagne, Quebec Liberal Party, Hochelaga, April 28, 1888 
 Joseph-Hormidas Legris, Parti national, Maskinongé, April 28, 1888 
 Tancrède Boucher de Grosbois, Quebec Liberal Party, Shefford, May 18, 1888 
 Séverin Dumais, Parti national, Chicoutimi et Saguenay, June 18, 1888 
 Honoré Brunelle Tourigny, Quebec Conservative Party, Nicolet, July 17, 1888 
 William Rhodes, Quebec Liberal Party, Mégantic, December 27, 1888 
 Rufus Nelson England, Quebec Conservative Party, Brome, November 28, 1889 
 Auguste Tessier, Quebec Liberal Party, Rimouski, December 4, 1889, 
 Omer Dostaler, Quebec Liberal Party, Berthier, Janvier 15, 1890

New provincial ridings

The electoral map was reformed in 1890 just a few months prior to the elections later that year. 

 Drummond et Arthabaska was split into two ridings: Drummond and Arthabaska
 Lac-Saint-Jean was created from parts of Chicoutimi et Saguenay.
 Matane was created from parts of Rimouski.
 Montréal-Est was split into three districts called Montréal division no. 1, Montréal division no. 2 and Montréal division no. 3
 Montréal-Ouest was split into two districts called Montréal division no. 4 and Montréal division no. 5.
 Montréal-Centre was renamed Montréal division no. 6.
 Richmond et Wolfe was split into two new riding: Richmond and Wolfe
 Saint-Sauveur was created from parts of Québec-Est.

Cabinet Ministers

Ross Cabinet (1886-1887)

 Prime Minister and Executive Council President: John Jones Ross
 Agriculture and public works: John Jones Ross
 Crown Lands: William Warren Lynch
 Attorney General: Louis-Olivier Taillon
 Secretary and Registry: Jean Blanchet
 Treasurer: Joseph Gibb Robertson
 Solicitor General: Edmund James Flynn

Taillon Cabinet (1887)

 Prime Minister and Executive Council President: Louis-Olivier Taillon
 Agriculture and public works: Henry Starnes
 Crown Lands: William Warren Lynch
 Attorney General: Louis-Olivier Taillon
 Secretary and Registry: Jean Blanchet
 Treasurer: Joseph Gibb Robertson
 Solicitor General: Edmund James Flynn

Mercier Cabinet (1887-1890)

 Prime Minister and Executive Council President: Honoré Mercier
 Agriculture and public works: James McShane (1887-1888)
 Agriculture and Colonization: Honoré Mercier (1888), William Rhodes (1888-1890)
 Public Works: Pierre Garneau (1888-1890)
 Crown Lands: Pierre Garneau (1887-1888), Georges Duhamel (1888-1890)
 Attorney General: Honoré Mercier (1887-1888), Arthur Turcotte (1888-1890)
 Secretary and Registry: Charles-Antoine-Ernest Gagnon (1887-1890), Joseph-Émery Robidoux (1890)
 Treasurer: Joseph Shehyn
 Solicitor General: Georges Duhamel (1887-1888)
 Members without portfolios: David Alexander Ross, Arthur Turcotte (1887-1888), Arthur Boyer (1890)

References
 1886 election results
 List of Historical Cabinet Ministers

006